Konstantin Viktorovich Ponomarev (born 1 January 1981) is a Russian professional racing cyclist.

Palmarès 

 2003
 1st, Stage 1, Volta a Lleida, Els Alamus
 2006
 2006–2007 Track Cycling World Cup
 2nd, Madison, Moscow (with Alexey Shmidt)
 2007
 2006–2007 Track Cycling World Cup
 3rd, Team Pursuit, Los Angeles (with Vasily Khatuntsev, Alexey Shmidt and Valery Valynin)
 3rd, Madison, Los Angeles (with Alexey Shmidt)

External links 

Russian male cyclists
Russian track cyclists
1981 births
Living people
Place of birth missing (living people)